White Oak Springs is a former settlement in Buckhorn Township, Brown County, Illinois, United States. White Oak Springs was northeast of Benville and north-northwest of Morrelville.

References

Geography of Brown County, Illinois
Ghost towns in Illinois